Norvell Kay Granger (born January 18, 1943) is an American Republican politician from the U.S. state of Texas serving as the U.S. representative for Texas's 12th congressional district since 1997. She has chaired the United States House Committee on Appropriations since 2023.

A former teacher and businesswoman, Granger is the first Republican woman to represent Texas in the U.S. House. After serving on the zoning commission of Fort Worth, Texas, in 1991 she was elected the city's first female mayor, serving two terms.

Early life

Granger was born in Greenville, Texas, and grew up in Fort Worth. She attended local public schools and Eastern Hills High School. She graduated from Texas Wesleyan University.

U.S. House of Representatives

Elections 
After Congressman Pete Geren announced he would retire in 1996, both the Democratic and Republican parties worked to recruit Granger to run for his seat. Republicans were bullish on their chances of winning Texas's 12th congressional district. It had once been represented by Democratic Speaker of the House Jim Wright, but legislative redistricting after the 1990 census had added areas with more Republican residents.

Granger ran as a Republican. She won handily, taking 56% of the vote against Democratic nominee Hugh Parmer, also a former Fort Worth mayor. She was reelected in 1998 and faced serious opposition only in 2000. In 2008, Granger defeated Democratic nominee Tracey Smith with 67% of the vote.

In 2006 Granger published What's Right About America, Celebrating Our Nation's Values, a book reflecting on lessons from prominent figures of U.S. history. That year, she was reelected to her sixth term in Congress, and was elected Conference Vice Chair, the fourth-ranking position among House Republicans. She previously served as chair of the House Appropriations Subcommittee on State-Foreign Operations. She also sat on the United States House Committee on Appropriations's Subcommittee on Defense (the first woman to do so), and the Labor, Health, Human Services, and Education Subcommittee. She has also served as a House Deputy Whip.

On September 25, 2007, Granger endorsed former Massachusetts governor Mitt Romney in the Republican presidential primary. She also took the position of national co-chair of the campaign organization Women for Mitt, filling a vacancy left by the death of Jennifer Dunn. In a statement to the press following her endorsement, she said that she had heard Romney speak and "I agreed with everything he said, in the order he said it."

She is a member of the International Republican Institute's and Southwestern University's board of directors. She is also a member of the Council on Foreign Relations and the board of trustees for the Harry S. Truman Scholarship foundation.

Tenure 
Granger is the first Republican woman to sit on the House Appropriations Subcommittee on Defense Appropriations, and became chair after Republicans won the House majority in the 2022 elections. She is the third consecutive woman to chair the committee, and the first Republican woman to do so.

Granger is a member of the Ripon Society, a moderate Republican group. The Washington Post described her as socially centrist, but fiscally conservative. Heritage Action, a conservative PAC, gave her a score of 59% conservative during the 115th Congress and a 57% lifetime score. In 2017, the Americans for Democratic Action, a liberal PAC, gave her a 15% rating. She has an 83% lifetime rating from the American Conservative Union. In 2013, the National Journal, a nonpartisan organization, gave Granger a composite political ideology score of 73% conservative and 27% liberal. According to FiveThirtyEight, as of February 2020, she had voted with President Trump's position on legislative issues about 97% of the time. As of October 2021, she had voted with President Biden's position on legislative issues about 11% of the time.

Granger was not present at Trump's second impeachment, on January 13, 2021, due to being diagnosed with COVID-19, and was one of four Republicans who did not vote, but said she opposed impeachment.

Reversal of position on abortion
Granger formerly supported abortion rights and Roe v. Wade. She reversed her position in 2020, saying she is now anti-abortion, and signed an amicus brief asking the Supreme Court to overturn Roe. This was an especially significant reversal given the fact that Granger's 1996 campaign was promoted by The WISH List, a pro-abortion rights PAC. The WISH List also supported her 2008 campaign. She received mixed ratings from groups that support legal abortion. Granger supported embryonic stem-cell research and voted against banning "chemically induced abortions." She voted for several spending bills that have included funding for Planned Parenthood, including some introduced in 2018. She introduced legislation banning federal funding for abortion with exceptions for cases of rape, incest, or to save the life of the woman. She supports banning abortion after 20 weeks. In 2013, she said abortion is not her top issue. She declined to cosponsor a bill to ban abortion after six weeks. In 2019, she signed a letter to President Trump urging him to "veto any appropriations bill that weakens current pro-life protections". She was endorsed by Texas Alliance for Life, an anti-abortion movement PAC, and the Susan B. Anthony List. Granger has said the Republican Party has too few women in Congress.

Other issues
Granger has voted several times in favor of an amendment to the United States Constitution to make it a crime to physically desecrate the American flag. She supported the Federal Marriage Amendment to define marriage as only permitted between a man and a woman, and also opposed letting same-sex couples adopt children. Granger was one of four Republicans in the House not to vote for or against repealing Don't Ask Don't Tell, though she previously voted against other repeal proposals. In 2017, she said she had "no comment" in response to Trump's decision to ban transgender troops from the military. She did not vote for or against legislation opposing the ban of transgender troops.

In June 2013, Granger was among the members of Congress to vote for an amendment to the National Defense Authorization Act for Fiscal Year 2014 to restrict the Pentagon from entering into new contracts with Russia's state arms broker, Rosoboronexport. In 2015, she opposed Trump's candidacy, saying, “He definitely should not be considered to speak for our nation as our president.” In 2020, she endorsed Trump and was endorsed by Trump.

Granger was part of a group of eight Republicans who spent July 4, 2018, meeting with Russian officials in advance of Trump's summit with Vladimir Putin.

During her tenure, Granger has supported more than $50 million in earmarks to infrastructure projects in Fort Worth that benefited the Trinity River Vision Authority, an organization her son heads.

Committee assignments
 Committee on Appropriations (Chair)

Caucus memberships
 Anti-Terrorism Caucus (Co-Chair)
United States Congressional International Conservation Caucus
 Iraqi Women's Caucus (Co-Chair)
 Sportsmen's Caucus
 Congressional Arts Caucus
 U.S.-Japan Caucus
 House Baltic Caucus
 Congressional NextGen 9-1-1 Caucus
Republican Study Committee

Personal life
Granger has three children and five grandchildren. She is a member of The United Methodist Church.

Honors
 In August 2007, Kay Granger Elementary School, named in her honor, opened in far north Fort Worth in the Northwest Independent School District.
 Kay Granger Park was named for her. It is a city park next to Mullendore Elementary, named for her mother, which opened several years earlier in North Richland Hills.
 She was elected to the Texas Women's Hall of Fame and the Fort Worth Business Hall of Fame.
 She received the National Federation of Independent Businesses' Champion of Small Business Award; the Manufacturing Legislative Excellence Award from the National Association of Manufacturers; and the Lifetime Achievement Award from the Greater Fort Worth Home Builders Association.
 In 1993, her high school recognized Granger as a distinguished alumnus.

Electoral history

See also
 Women in the United States House of Representatives

References

External links 

 Congresswoman Kay Granger official U.S. House website
 Kay Granger for Congress
 
 
 
 Profile at the Texas Tribune

|-

|-

|-

|-

1943 births
21st-century American politicians
21st-century American women politicians
American Methodists
Methodists from Texas
Female members of the United States House of Representatives
International Republican Institute
Living people
Mayors of Fort Worth, Texas
People from Greenville, Texas
Protestants from Texas
Republican Party members of the United States House of Representatives from Texas
Women mayors of places in Texas
Women state legislators in Texas